"I Met a Little Girl" is a song recorded by singer Marvin Gaye for his Here, My Dear album. Recorded at his studio in 1976, the song chronicles the growth and demise of Gaye's marriage to his first wife Anna. In a classic doo-wop style, Gaye croons in his falsetto about how he fell for Anna and how their love died out, chronicling the years between their wedding and their impending divorce. At the end of the song, Gaye responds "Hallelujah, I'm free" in a dark and somber tone.

Personnel
All vocals by Marvin Gaye
Piano and synthesizers by Marvin Gaye
Drums by Bugsy Wilcox
Guitar by Wali Ali
Bass by Frank Blair
Guitar by Gordon Banks

Marvin Gaye songs
1978 songs
Songs written by Marvin Gaye
Song recordings produced by Marvin Gaye